Jawahar Navodaya Vidyalaya, Longnak or locally known as JNV Longnak is a boarding, co-educational  school in Mokokchung district of Nagaland state in India. Navodaya Vidyalayas are funded by the Indian Ministry of Human Resources Development and administered  by Navodaya Vidyalaya Smiti, an autonomous body under the ministry.

History 
The school was established in 2004, and is a part of Jawahar Navodaya Vidyalaya schools. This school is administered and monitored by Shillong regional office of Navodaya Vidyalaya Smiti.

Admission 
Admission to JNV Mokokchung at class VI level is made through selection test conducted by Navodaya Vidyalaya Smiti. The information about test is disseminated and advertised by the Mokokchung district magistrate (Collector), who is also chairperson of Vidyalya Management Committee.

Affiliations 
JNV Mokokchung is affiliated to Central Board of Secondary Education with affiliation number 1440005.

See also 

 List of JNV schools

References

External links 

 Official Website of JNV Mokokchung

High schools and secondary schools in Nagaland
Mokokchung
Educational institutions established in 2004
2004 establishments in Nagaland